The 1985 Scottish Professional Championship was a professional non-ranking snooker tournament, which took place in February 1985 in Edinburgh, Scotland.

Murdo MacLeod won the title by beating Eddie Sinclair 10–2 in the final.

Main draw

References

Scottish Professional Championship
Scottish Professional Championship
Scottish Professional Championship
Scottish Professional Championship
Sports competitions in Edinburgh